Route 232 is a two-lane east/west provincial highway on the south shore of the St. Lawrence River in the Bas-Saint-Laurent region of Eastern Quebec, Canada. Its eastern terminus is in Rimouski at the junction of Route 132 and the western terminus is at the junction of Route 289 in Rivière-Bleue. The route temporarily becomes A-85 along a 3 kilometre section through Cabano.

Municipalities along Route 232
 Rimouski
 Sainte-Blandine
 Mont-Lebel
 La Trinité-des-Monts
 Esprit-Saint
 Lac-des-Aigles
 Cabano

See also
 List of Quebec provincial highways

References

External links 
 Provincial Route Map (Courtesy of the Quebec Ministry of Transportation) 
Route 232 on Google Maps

232
Roads in Bas-Saint-Laurent